Dejardin is a surname. Notable people with the surname include:

 Ian Dejardin, British museum director and art historian
 Joseph Dejardin (1873–1932), Belgian trade unionist and politician
 Lucie Dejardin (1875–1945), Belgian politician

See also 
 Desjardin (disambiguation)
 Desjardins (disambiguation)